Timothy John O'Brien (born 31 March 1964) is a British astronomer, currently working at the University of Manchester as Professor of Astrophysics. He often appears on the BBC.

Early life and education
He was born in Littleborough, Greater Manchester. He grew up in Castleton, Greater Manchester in the Metropolitan Borough of Rochdale. He attended school in Rochdale. He studied Physics and Astrophysics at University College London and completed his PhD at the University of Manchester between 1985 and 1988.

Career and research
He taught at the University of Liverpool in the 1990s. He began working at the University of Manchester in 1999 where he is currently associate director of the Jodrell Bank Centre for Astrophysics. He is also Director of Teaching & Learning in the University's School of Physics & Astronomy. From 2009–2015, he taught the first year undergraduate course in Astrophysics.

His research is primarily in the area of novae (thermonuclear explosions on white dwarf stars in binary star systems) and includes both theoretical work and observations using telescopes around the world and in space working across the electromagnetic spectrum.

Broadcasting
He has appeared on Stargazing Live on BBC Two and The Infinite Monkey Cage on BBC Radio 4.

Personal life
O'Brien is married to Professor Teresa Anderson (born 1 December 1962). He lived for a time in Macclesfield and currently lives in south Manchester. He has a younger sister (born 1965) and a younger brother (born 1967).

References

 

1964 births
Academics of the University of Liverpool
Academics of the University of Manchester
Alumni of the University of Manchester
Alumni of University College London
British astrophysicists
British people of Irish descent
21st-century British astronomers
English physicists
Jodrell Bank Observatory
People from Littleborough, Greater Manchester
Science communicators
Living people